Máximo Arturo Gámez González (born November 28, 1989) is a Nicaraguan professional defender currently playing for Managua.

Club career
Gámez was signed by Deportivo Ocotal in summer 2008, then joined Managua in January 2012.

International career
Gámez made his debut for Nicaragua in a September 2011 FIFA World Cup qualification match against Dominica and has, as of December 2013, earned a total of 9 caps, scoring no goals. He has represented his country in 4 FIFA World Cup qualification matches and played at the 2013 Copa Centroamericana.

References

External links
 

1989 births
Living people
People from Nueva Segovia Department
Association football defenders
Nicaraguan men's footballers
Nicaragua international footballers
Managua F.C. players
2009 UNCAF Nations Cup players
2013 Copa Centroamericana players